Roshan Thapa is a singer and music director (composer) in the Nepali music industry. He is known for his work on his first movie, Loot. The item song 'Udhreko choli' was famous at the time. Another song of the movie, 'Mera ti khushi haru', was nominated for Best movie song at the Image Music Awards of 2012.

Productions

Director
Udhareko Choli - feature song
Mera Ti Khushi Haru... - feature song
Bhagera Janchas Kaha - feature song
Talkyo Jawani - feature song
Note Note - feature song
jawani 
chatta rumal
Paanpatey saila dai

Movie Music Composes 
Loot - Nepali
Loot 2 - Nepali
Saadhe 7 - Nepali
Jatra - Nepali
chachahui - Nepali 
2 Rupiya

References

Living people
21st-century Nepalese male singers
Nepalese composers
Year of birth missing (living people)